Rehoboth, also known as Turpin Place or Lee Mansion, is a historic home located at Eldorado, Dorchester County, Maryland, United States. It is a -story Flemish bond brick house. A chimney rises flush with the one gable end, and a -story frame kitchen wing is attached to the other end. The interior of the house was gutted by fire in October 1916, and rebuilt. It was the family home of the second elected Governor of Maryland, Thomas Sim Lee.

Rehoboth was listed on the National Register of Historic Places in 1972.

References

External links
, including photo from 1968, at Maryland Historical Trust
 Rehoboth, Punkum Road, Eldorado, Dorchester County, MD: 2 photos and 6 data pages at Historic American Buildings Survey

Houses on the National Register of Historic Places in Maryland
Houses in Dorchester County, Maryland
Houses completed in 1783
Historic American Buildings Survey in Maryland
National Register of Historic Places in Dorchester County, Maryland